No. 681 Squadron RAF was a photo-reconnaissance squadron of the Royal Air Force during the Second World War.

History
It was formed out of No. 3 PRU, at Dum Dum in India on 2 January 1943, as part of RAF Far East Air Force.  Initially it was mostly equipped with Hurricane PR.Mk.II and Spitfire PR.Mk.IV fighters, but there was also a Dutch element in 'C' flight that operated North American Mitchells, which belonged to the former Royal Netherlands East Indies Army Air Force. The squadron re-equipped with Mosquito PR.IXs in August 1943, and Spitfire PR.XIs in October.

In November 1943 the twin-engined elements were used to form No. 684 Squadron RAF. 681 Squadron, which was now entirely equipped with the Spitfire PR.XI, moved to RAF Alipore, Bengal in May 1944, where the squadron was under No. 171 Wing RAF on 1 July 1944 , and RAF Mingaladon, Burma in June 1945, receiving Spitfire PR.XIX photo-reconnaissance aircraft in August of that year.  The squadron moved to RAF Kai Tak, Hong Kong, in September 1945, when the war formally ended.  Detachments from the squadron however were still located and kept busy at a wide range of airfields across the South-East Asian theatre of war.  The squadron was disbanded by renumbering it to No. 34 Squadron RAF on 1 August 1946 at RAF Palam, Punjab, (then) British India.

Aircraft operated

Squadron airfields

Commanding officers

References

Notes

Bibliography

External links

 Squadron Histories and more for Nos. 671–1435 Squadron on RAFweb
 History of 681 Squadron
 No. 681 Squadron RAF movement and equipment history

681
Military units and formations established in 1943
Aircraft squadrons of the Royal Air Force in World War II
Military units and formations disestablished in 1946
Reconnaissance units and formations of the Royal Air Force
Military of Hong Kong under British rule